Personal health applications (PHA) are tools and services in medical informatics which utilizes information technologies to aid individuals to create their own personal health information. These next generation consumer-centric information systems help improve health care delivery, self-management and wellness by providing clear and complete information, which increases understanding, competence and awareness. Personal health applications are part of the Medicine 2.0 movement.

Definition
Personal Health Application is an electronic tool of storing, managing and sharing health information in illness and wellness by an individual in a secure and confidential environment.

Benefits
Most people do not carry medical records when they leave home. They do not realize that in an emergency these medical records can make a big difference; additionally, it is hard to predict when an emergency might occur. In fact, they could save a life. Previous medications, history of allergy to medications, and other significant medical or surgical history can help a health professional through PHA tools to optimize treatment.

A Personal Health Application (PHA) tool contains a patient's personal data (name, date of birth and other demographic details). It also includes a patient’s diagnosis or health condition and details about the various treatment/assessments delivered by health professionals during an episode of care from a health care provider. It contains an individuals health-related information accumulated during an entire lifetime.

See also
 eHealth
 mHealth
 Personal health record

References

Health informatics